Peter James McParland MBE (born 25 April 1934) is a Northern Irish former professional footballer who played as an outside left.

Club career

Dundalk
McParland was born in Newry, County Down, Northern Ireland. He was spotted playing for Dundalk in the League of Ireland by Aston Villa manager George Martin. Martin signed McParland for a fee of £3,880.

Aston Villa
McParland holds a unique place in English football history as the first player in the game to score in and win both English major domestic knockout Finals. One of the finest headers and strikers of the ball of the past fifty years, he is regarded as one of the greatest players to represent both Aston Villa and Northern Ireland.

During his time with Aston Villa, McParland got influenced by Jimmy Hogan, later won the FA Cup in 1957, scoring twice in the final against Manchester United but also becoming involved in a controversial incident in which he shoulder-charged (at the time a legitimate form of challenge) the Manchester United keeper after only 6 minutes which left United's goalkeeper, Ray Wood, unconscious with a broken cheekbone. McParland's two-goal haul is remembered fondly as an example of his all-round abilities as a player showcasing his diving header and volleying techniques.

McParland also won the Second Division title in 1960 and the League Cup in 1961 while with Aston Villa. He was on the scoresheet for the second leg of the 1961 League Cup final, when Villa overturned a 2–0 deficit against Rotherham United to win the second leg 3–0 at Villa Park and become the winners of the first Football League Cup.

Wolverhampton Wanderers and Plymouth Argyle
Following Aston Villa, McParland joined local rivals Wolverhampton Wanderers for a brief spell in 1962. Although he was only there for one season, he did manage to score 10 goals in 21 games. The following season McParland moved on to Plymouth Argyle, his final English league club (although he later turned out for Worcester City in the Southern League), before hanging up his boots. In 1965, McParland was recruited to play for Toronto Inter-Roma FC of the Eastern Canadian Professional Soccer League. He scored many memorable goals, especially one against the Hamilton Steelers to give his side the victory.

McParland played for the Atlanta Chiefs of the North American Soccer League in 1967 and 1968.
He ended his career as player-manager of Glentoran.

International career
McParland represented Northern Ireland 34 times and scored twice in his debut against Wales in 1953–54 season.

He also starred for Northern Ireland in the 1958 FIFA World Cup in which he scored five goals and helped his team to the quarter-finals. France defeated Northern Ireland 4–0 in their quarter-final.

He holds the record for being the highest-scoring Northern Irish player in World Cup finals history.

In April 2015, the feature-length documentary Spirit of '58 was screened as part of the Belfast Film Festival. It featured Peter McParland prominently alongside the other surviving players at the time (Billy Bingham, Billy Simpson, Jimmy McIlroy and Harry Gregg) as it told the story of Northern Ireland's journey throughout the 1950s under the managership of Peter Doherty, culminating in the 1958 World Cup. Following the death of Billy Bingham in June 2022, McParland is the last surviving member of the Northern Ireland squad from that World Cup campaign.

Career statistics
Scores and results list Northern Ireland's goal tally first, score column indicates score after each McParland goal.

References

External links

1934 births
Living people
Aston Villa F.C. players
Dundalk F.C. players
League of Ireland players
1958 FIFA World Cup players
Members of the Order of the British Empire
Northern Ireland international footballers
Association footballers from Northern Ireland
Expatriate association footballers from Northern Ireland
National Professional Soccer League (1967) players
North American Soccer League (1968–1984) players
Atlanta Chiefs players
Expatriate soccer players in the United States
Sportspeople from Newry
Plymouth Argyle F.C. players
Wolverhampton Wanderers F.C. players
Worcester City F.C. players
Toronto Roma players
Football managers from Northern Ireland
Glentoran F.C. managers
AEL Limassol managers
Eastern Canada Professional Soccer League players
English Football League players
English Football League representative players
Expatriate football managers from Northern Ireland
Expatriate football managers in Hong Kong
Hong Kong national football team managers
Expatriate football managers in Cyprus
Expatriate sportspeople from Northern Ireland in Cyprus
Association football forwards
Expatriate soccer players in Canada
Expatriate sportspeople from Northern Ireland in Canada
Expatriate sportspeople from Northern Ireland in the United States
Expatriate sportspeople from Northern Ireland in Hong Kong
FA Cup Final players